Vital Heynen (born 12 June 1969) is a Belgian professional volleyball coach and former player. He currently serves as head coach for the Germany women's national team and Nilüfer Belediyespor.

Career as coach
Heynen started out his career as a volleyball coach in his hometown club Noliko Maaseik. In 2005 he became assistant coach and a year later - a head coach. During his six-year work at the club, his team won four Belgian Championships, five Belgian Cups and four Supercups. Additionally Heynen was twice named Belgian Coach of the Year in 2009 and 2011. In 2012 he left his hometown club and joined Turkish club Ziraat Bankası Ankara, which he coached in the season 2012/2013. In December 2013 he was named a new coach of Transfer Bydgoszcz, PlusLiga.

In February 2012 he became a head coach of Germany national team.
At the World Championship 2014 his team beat France in 3rd place match and won bronze medal. In 2017 he took over Belgian national team. On 7 February 2018 Heynen was chosen as the new head coach of Poland men's national volleyball team. At the World Championship 2018 in Italy, Poland led by Heynen beat Brazil in the final, defended the World Championship 2014 title, and achieved 3rd World Champion title in total. In 2019 Heynen coached Poland to the European Championship 2019 bronze medal by beating France in 3rd place match and losing only to Slovenia in the semifinal. At the FIVB World Cup 2019 his team lost only against USA and Brazil and eventually was placed 2nd in the competition, winning the silver medal. In November, 2019 he became a head coach of Sir Safety Conad Perugia. In the 2019/2020 season Sir Safety Perugia coached by Heynen achieved the Italian SuperCup after defeating Modena Volley in the final.

Honours

As a player
 CEV European Champions Cup
  1996/1997 – with Noliko Maaseik
  1998/1999 – with Noliko Maaseik
 National championships
 1995/1996  Belgian Championship, with Noliko Maaseik
 1996/1997  Belgian SuperCup, with Noliko Maaseik
 1996/1997  Belgian Cup, with Noliko Maaseik
 1996/1997  Belgian Championship, with Noliko Maaseik
 1997/1998  Belgian SuperCup, with Noliko Maaseik
 1997/1998  Belgian Cup, with Noliko Maaseik
 1997/1998  Belgian Championship, with Noliko Maaseik
 1998/1999  Belgian SuperCup, with Noliko Maaseik
 1998/1999  Belgian Cup, with Noliko Maaseik
 1998/1999  Belgian Championship, with Noliko Maaseik
 1999/2000  Belgian SuperCup, with Noliko Maaseik
 2000/2001  Belgian SuperCup, with Noliko Maaseik
 2000/2001  Belgian Cup, with Noliko Maaseik
 2000/2001  Belgian Championship, with Noliko Maaseik
 2001/2002  Belgian SuperCup, with Noliko Maaseik
 2001/2002  Belgian Cup, with Noliko Maaseik
 2001/2002  Belgian Championship, with Noliko Maaseik
 2002/2003  Belgian SuperCup, with Noliko Maaseik
 2002/2003  Belgian Cup, with Noliko Maaseik
 2002/2003  Belgian Championship, with Noliko Maaseik
 2003/2004  Belgian Cup, with Noliko Maaseik
 2003/2004  Belgian Championship, with Noliko Maaseik

As a coach
 CEV Cup
  2007/2008 – with Noliko Maaseik
 National championships
 2006/2007  Belgian Cup, with Noliko Maaseik
 2007/2008  Belgian SuperCup, with Noliko Maaseik
 2007/2008  Belgian Cup, with Noliko Maaseik
 2007/2008  Belgian Championship, with Noliko Maaseik
 2008/2009  Belgian SuperCup, with Noliko Maaseik
 2008/2009  Belgian Cup, with Noliko Maaseik
 2008/2009  Belgian Championship, with Noliko Maaseik
 2009/2010  Belgian SuperCup, with Noliko Maaseik
 2009/2010  Belgian Cup, with Noliko Maaseik
 2010/2011  Belgian Championship, with Noliko Maaseik
 2011/2012  Belgian SuperCup, with Noliko Maaseik
 2011/2012  Belgian Cup, with Noliko Maaseik
 2011/2012  Belgian Championship, with Noliko Maaseik
 2014/2015  French SuperCup, with Tours VB
 2015/2016  German SuperCup, with VfB Friedrichshafen
 2015/2016  German Cup, with VfB Friedrichshafen
 2016/2017  German SuperCup, with VfB Friedrichshafen
 2016/2017  German Cup, with VfB Friedrichshafen
 2017/2018  German SuperCup, with VfB Friedrichshafen
 2017/2018  German Cup, with VfB Friedrichshafen
 2018/2019  German SuperCup, with VfB Friedrichshafen
 2018/2019  German Cup, with VfB Friedrichshafen
 2019/2020  Italian SuperCup, with Sir Safety Perugia
 2020/2021  Italian SuperCup, with Sir Safety Perugia

References

External links

 
 
 Coach profile at LegaVolley.it     
 Coach/Player profile at Volleybox.net

1969 births
Living people
People from Maaseik
Sportspeople from Limburg (Belgium)
Belgian men's volleyball players
Belgian volleyball coaches
Volleyball coaches of international teams
Belgian expatriate sportspeople in Germany
Belgian expatriate sportspeople in Turkey
Belgian expatriate sportspeople in Poland
Belgian expatriate sportspeople in France
Belgian expatriate sportspeople in Italy
Setters (volleyball)
Coaches at the 2020 Summer Olympics